Culter Junior Football Club  are a Scottish football club from the village of Peterculter, a suburb of Aberdeen. Members of the Scottish Junior Football Association, they currently play in the  SJFA North Superleague. The club are based at Crombie Park and their colours are red and white.

Culter made history, along with Linlithgow Rose and Pollok by becoming the first Junior football teams to enter the first round proper of the Scottish Cup for the 2007–08 competition. This was due to the SFA allowing up to four Junior teams to enter, if those teams had won one of the three Super Leagues or the Scottish Junior Cup. They have played in the Cup on four occasions, in 2007–08, 2011–12, 2013–14 and 2014–15, reaching the third round on the first three occasions and the second round in their most recent attempt.

The team have been managed since November 2018 by Lee Youngson.

Honours
North Region Superleague winners: 2003–04, 2004–05, 2005–06, 2006–07, 2010–11, 2012–13, 2013-14
North East Division One winners: 2000–01
North Regional Cup: 1989–90, 1999–00, 2011–12, 2013–14
McLeman Cup: 1988–89, 1992–93, 2000–01, 2009–10, 2010–11, 2012–13, 2013–14
North Region Grill League Cup: 2005–06, 2010–11
Archibald Cup: 1987–88, 1989–90
Jimmy Gibb Trophy: 2000–01
Aberdeen Cable TV Cup: 1989–90, 1992–93
Acorn Heating Cup 2002–03, 2004–05

The Scottish Cup
Culter won their very first Scottish Cup tie at Crombie Park on Saturday 29 September 2007. They beat Hawick Royal Albert of the East of Scotland Football League, 7–0 in the First Round. They were drawn in a tough second round tie with Vale of Leithen at home, goals from Gordon Farmer and a goal four minutes from time by Graham Cadger was enough to see them progress through to the third round with a 2–1 scoreline. They were then drawn to face Huntly in the third round on 24 November, where their campaign ended in a 3–1 defeat.

In the 2011–12 season, Culter again advanced to the third round—despite losing to Spartans in the second round—as Spartans were expelled from the competition for fielding an ineligible player. They held Partick Thistle to a draw at home before being defeated 4–0 in the replay at Firhill.

In the 2013–14 season, they reached the third round yet again, beating Newton Stewart, of the South of Scotland Football League, 6–0 in the second round. In the third round, they held Berwick Rangers at home, but lost the replay 3–1. In the following season, 2014–15, they qualified yet again, but were beaten 7–1 in the second round by Bo'ness United of the SJFA East Region Super League.

References

External links
Club website

Sources
Non-league Scotland

Football clubs in Scotland
Scottish Junior Football Association clubs
Football clubs in Aberdeen
Association football clubs established in 1893